Matteo Pizzigallo (Martina Franca 17 July 1950 – Rome 19 July 2018) was an Italian essayist and historian. He attended La Sapienza University in Rome and graduated in 1972.

Biography 
He was a pupil of Renato Mori, famous historian of the Ethiopia war. He was also in the group of the assistant professors of Aldo Moro, the Italian statesman, killed by the Brigate Rosse and that remembered him and the other young colleagues in his last letters written when he was imprisoned.
He was full professor of History of Political Parties and Movements, and also of History of International Relations at the University of Naples  “Federico II”, at the Accademia Aeronautica of Pozzuoli and at LUMSA University of Rome. Scholar of Economic Diplomacy and Euro-Arab relations, he was the author of several monographs and essays translated also in English and Arabic. He dealt with the Italian foreign policy, with the Italian oil policy in the 1920s and after the Second World War. He dealt with the Italian relations with the countries of the southern shore of the Mediterranean supporting the diplomacy of “friendship”.
He was a commentator on RAI TG1-Unomattina, Rai Parlamento, Radio Vaticana and La Gazzetta del Mezzogiorno. He was a founding member of the Italian Society of International History (SISI).

Bibliography 

	Alle origini della politica petrolifera italiana, Roma, 1980, Giuffrè Editore
	Mediterraneo e Russia nella politica italiana, Roma, 1983, Giuffrè Editore
	L'Agip degli anni ruggenti, Roma, 1984, Giuffrè Editore
	La politica estera dell'Agip, Roma, 1992, Giuffrè Editore
	Le risorse energetiche dalla stabilità alla crisi petrolifera, in V. Castronovo, Storia dell'economia mondiale, pp. 98–128, Roma-Bari, 2000, Laterza, .
	Disarmo navale e Turchia nella politica italiana 1921–1922. Napoli, 2004, ESI, .
	La diplomazia dell'amicizia. Italia e Arabia Saudita, Napoli, 2004, ESI, RIYAD: Fondazione Re IBN SAUD (2005) in arabo.
	L'Italia e il riconoscimento della repubblica siriana, 2004, CLIO, p. 633-651, ISSN 0391-6731
	L'Italia e il mediterraneo orientale (1946-1950), Milano, 2004, Franco Angeli, .
	Amicizie mediterranee e interesse nazionale (1946-1954), vol. 1, pp. 1–223, Milano, 2006, Franco Angeli, .
	L'economia ionica e la nascita dell'Italsider di Taranto, in R. Nistri, Taranto, pp. 39–88, Taranto, 2007, Mandese Editore, .
	Diplomazia parallela e politica petrolifera italiana, in M.De Leonardis, Il mediterraneo nella politica estera italiana, pp. 141–160, Bologna, 2007, Il Mulino, .
	La diplomazia italiana e i paesi Arabi dell'oriente mediterraneo, Milano, 2008, Franco Angeli, .
	Cooperazione e relazioni internazionali. Milano, 2008, Franco Angeli, .
	Le risorse energetiche dalla stabilità alla crisi petrolifera, in V. Castronovo, Storia della economia mondiale, vol. 10, pp. 455–470, Roma, Bari, Milano, 2009, Gius. Laterza e figli / Il sole 24 ore s.p.a., .
	Storie rimosse. Studi sulla nascita delle impresse pubbliche, Napoli, 2010, Pisanti Editore, .
	Le origini di una grande amicizia: Mattei e Marcora negli anni della Resistenza, in E. Bernardi, Giovanni Marcora, pp. 50–61, Soveria Mannelli, 2010, Rubbettino, .
	Il Ponte sul Mediterraneo, le relazioni fra l'Italia e i Paesi Arabi rivieraschi (1989-2009), Roma, 2011, Editrice Apes, .
	L'Italia e le monarchie petrolifere del golfo (1991-2011), Roma, 2012, Editrice Apes srl, doi: 10.978.887233/0890
	La politica Araba dell'Italia democristiana. Studi e ricerche sugli anni Cinquanta, Milano, 2013, Franco Angeli Editore, .
	History of an 80-Year-long friendship: Italy-Saudi Arabia 1932–2012, in S. Colombo (a cura di), Italy and Saudi Arabia confronting the challenges of the XXI century, p. 17-37, Roma, 2013, Edizioni Nuova Cultura, .
	Sulla via di Samarcanda. Le relazioni fra l'Italia e le Repubbliche ex sovietiche dell'Asia Centrale, pp. 1–120, Roma, 2014, Bordeaux Edizioni, .
	Una buona politica estera. Italia e Paesi Arabi. Studi e ricerche, Roma, 2015, Ed srl, .
	Dieci anni come un secolo: un'ipotesi di lettura critica, in E. Ferragina (a cura di), Rapporto sulle economie del Mediterraneo 2015, p. 19-31, Bologna, Società editrice il Mulino, .
	"The Bastion with clay feet": Italian diplomacy and the Baghdad Pact. in L. Ratti, P. Wulzer (a cura di), Case Studies in International Security, Berna, 2018, Peter Lang, .

Notes

Other websites 

 Uno mattina, Matteo Pizzigallo

1950 births
2018 deaths
Italian political scientists
Academic staff of the University of Naples Federico II
Sapienza University of Rome alumni
Italian essayists
20th-century Italian historians
People from Martina Franca
21st-century Italian historians